Alfred Solaas (April 15, 1912 – November 23, 1968) was a Norwegian actor, film director, and theater director. He was engaged for many years at the Oslo New Theater.

Career
Solaas debuted in 1934 at the Carl Johan Theater. After that, he was engaged with the Central Theater from 1935 to 1939 and with the Oslo New Theater from 1940 to 1960, followed by freelance work. At the Central Theater his appearances included roles in The Threepenny Opera (Norwegian title: Tolvskillingsoperaen) in 1938 and in Finn Bo's revue Takk for sist (Nice to See You Again), and he received praise for his role as Arv in Ludvig Holberg's Jean de France. He made his debut as a director in 1946 and staged Shakespeare plays such as Hamlet, A Midsummer Night's Dream, and As You Like It. He also staged Henrik Ibsen's Peer Gynt and musicals such as My Fair Lady. He launched the Summer Theater in Frogner Park in 1953 and led it until his death in 1968.

Solaas also had several supporting roles in Norwegian films. He made his film debut here in 1937 with a small supporting role in Gyda Christensen and Tancred Ibsen's crime comedy To levende og en død. In addition, he appeared in films such as Trysil-Knut (1942), Om kjærlighet synger de (1946), Hans Nielsen Hauge (1961), Tonny (1962), and De ukjentes marked (1968). He also had some appearances on NRK's Television Theater.

In 1949, he directed the 39-minute short film Aldri mer!

Filmography

Film actor
 1937: To levende og en død as a guest at the hostel
 1939: Familien på Borgan as Erik Nelson 
 1939: Hu Dagmar as Olaf, a servant at the Råvangen farm
 1942: Det æ'kke te å tru as the master of ceremonies
 1942: Trysil-Knut as the bailiff's servant
 1946: Om kjærligheten synger de as Potten
 1948: Den hemmelighetsfulle leiligheten as a gentleman
 1953: Skøytekongen
 1961: Hans Nielsen Hauge as Urdahl the parish priest in Tune 
 1962: Tonny
 1963: Freske fraspark
 1968: De ukjentes marked

Film director
 1949: Aldri mer! (short film)

Television actor
 1963: Læraren
 1966: Nederlaget as Brigeau

References

External links
 
 Alfred Solaas at Filmfront

1912 births
1968 deaths
Norwegian male stage actors
Norwegian male film actors
20th-century Norwegian male actors
Norwegian film directors
Male actors from Oslo